The No Pants Subway Ride aka Ride The Train Naked Day (or No Trousers on the Tube Ride in the UK) is an annual event where people ride rapid transit or subway while they are not wearing pants. Beginning in New York in 2002, the event spread to as many as sixty cities .

History 

The annual No Pants Subway Ride event is a day where people ride the subway while they are not wearing pants. The event is organized by Improv Everywhere, and has coordinators in cities around the world. This event takes place each year in early January; the date is announced in early December on Improv Everywhere's site.

The first No Pants Subway Ride began with seven riders in 2002 on the New York City Subway. In 2006, 150 people participated in New York City. During that event, eight were handcuffed for disorderly conduct, but the charges were later dismissed. For 2013, sixty cities had coordinators.

In January 2016, the event happened for the first time in Moscow, Russia. The participants were investigated by the police under the offense of the "instigating of mass public disorder", however there are opinions the accusations would not stand ground, since the organizers' goal was to make people laugh.

See also 
 No Pants Day
 Undie Run
 World Naked Bike Ride

References

Further reading 

Community organizing
Unofficial observances
Railway culture
Activities in underwear